The Umbrella was a Canadian arts talk show television series which aired on CBC Television in 1966.

Premise
Artist William Ronald hosted this series concerning contemporary art. On the debut episode, Ronald discussed his paintings with a group of students. Rita Greer Allen, Barry Callaghan, and Timothy Findley were regularly correspondents on the series. Interview subjects during the series included John Cage, Jack Chambers, Greg Curnoe, Marcel Duchamp (recorded in New York), William Hutt, George and Mike Kuchar, Judy LaMarsh, Michael Langham, Margaret Laurence (recorded in the UK), Brian Macdonald, Henry Moore, Sydney Newman, James Reaney, Larry Rivers, Alan Sillitoe and Arnold Wesker.

Series music was provided by a quartet led by Wray Downes of which Ed Bickert was a member.

Scheduling
This half-hour series was broadcast on Sundays at 5 p.m. (Eastern) from 3 April to 26 June 1966 then from 9 October to 18 December 1966.

References

External links
 

CBC Television original programming
1966 Canadian television series debuts
1966 Canadian television series endings
1960s Canadian television talk shows
Television series about art